Carara Kicks was a South African football (soccer) club based in Welkom, Free State that played in the
National First Division.

The club is owned by Motebang Mokoena, the son of Free State Stars owner Mike Mokoena and serves as a feeder team to Free State Stars who play in the Premier Soccer League.

External links
Premier Soccer League
NFD Club Info

Soccer clubs in South Africa
Association football clubs established in 2000
National First Division clubs
Soccer clubs in the Free State (province)
2000 establishments in South Africa
Matjhabeng Local Municipality